The Cincinnati Art Club was formed in 1890 and is one of the oldest continually operating groups or collectives of artists in the United States.

It was formed for the purpose of “advancing the knowledge and love of art through education.” The Club achieves its mission through exhibitions, lectures, hands-on demonstrations, sketch and painting group work sessions, monthly critique sessions, maintenance of an art library and awarding of student scholarships.

History 

In the latter part of the 1800s a strong colony of working artists had established a small 'Montmartre' on the upper end of Vine Street in Cincinnati. One group of artists gathered informally as the Cincinnati Sketch Club and had its origins in the studio of John Rettig in 1883. The loose collection of artists became the Cincinnati Art Club on 15 March 1890. Its first president was John Rettig and consisted of 14 members (which included a pet dog so the membership number wasn't an unlucky 13). The founding members were: Rettig, Clarence D. Bartlett, James McLaughlin, Edward S. Butler, Matthew A. Daly, Albert O. Elzner, Edward Johnson, Remmington Lane, Leon van Loo, Lewis C. Lutz, William A. McCord, Perry Morris and Joseph Henry Sharp.

The club grew rapidly and within a year of its founding growing to 32 active members and 36 associate members.

Initially the club was bohemian in nature and did not have a fixed abode and met in the homes or studios of members. The host of the meeting would become the owner of all sketches made. In 1907, the club moved to a new home in the Harrison building and was considered the most attractive home to artists in the Middle West. A club house was eventually purchased in 1923 on Third Street.

A regular constitution was adopted in 1892 “to advance the knowledge and love of art through exhibitions of works of art, lectures on subjects pertaining to art, and to promote social intercourse amongst its members.”

The club became an advocate for artists and in 1908, the CAC President John Ritter submitted a letter which was presented at a congressional hearing on the arts tariff in Washington DC before the Ways and Means Committee.

The club was restricted to males until 1979 when women were allowed to become members.

Notable members 
 Wilbur G. Adam, club president - 1965–67, portraiture and landscapes painter. 
Frank Duveneck, club president - 1896–98. Cincinnati's best-known artist in the late 1800s and early 1900s, was appointed the club's critic. 
 Henry Farny, club president - 1892–94, creator of the club's trademark, the dragonfly. A famed painter of American Indians.
 John Hauser, one of the club's earliest members. Painter best known for his portraits of American Indians and Indigenous peoples of the Americas.
 Charles S. Kaelin, an American Impressionist painter.
 Winsor McCay, an American cartoonist and animator.
 Lewis Henry Meakin, club president - 1912–14. An American Impressionist landscape artist.
 Frank Harmon Myers, Impressionist painter known for seascapes.
 Edward Henry Potthast, an American Impressionist painter.
 John A. Ruthven, an American wildlife painter.
 Joseph Henry Sharp, a painter of the American West.
 Leon Van Loo, the club's third and eighth president. Belgian-born photographer and art promoter.

Club presidents 
2018–present Donald A. Schuster

2016–2018 Clark Stevens

2012–2016 Todd Channer

2010-2012            Tom Bluemlein

2008-2010            Kay Worz

2006-2008            Tim Boone

2003-2006            Mike McGuire

2001-2003            Lester W. Miley

1998-2001            David Klocke

1995-1998            Roger Heuck

1993-1995            Judith Q. Barnett

1990-1993            Thomas R. Eckley

1989-1990            Oren Miller

1987-1989            Lester W. Miley

1985-1987            Martha Weber

1983-1985            Sherman Peeno

1981-1983            Dale Benedict

1978-1981            Lou Austerman

1976-1978            Ray Loos

1974-1976            Gene Hinckley

1973-1974            Charles Baltzer

1971-1973            Don Dennis

1969-1971            Joseph E. Peter

1967-1969            George Stille

1965-1967            Wilbur G. Adam

1964-1965            Ray Becker

24 April 1964     Charles W. L. Schlapp (Honorary President)

1963-1964            Jerome P. Costello

1961-1963            Mathias J. Noheimer

1959-1961            E. Kenneth Moore

1957-1959            George H. Strietmann

1955-1957            Frederic H. Kock

1953-1955            Vernon C. Rader

1951-1953            Joseph O. Emmett

1949-1951            Harland J. Johnson

1947-1949            Lawrence H. Smith

1945-1947            Merton W. Willmore

1943-1945            Maurice R. Rhoades

1941-1943            Norman H. Doane

1939-1941            Arthur L. Helwig

1937-1939            Julian J. Bechtold

1935-1937            Carl J. Zimmerman

1933-1935            Reginald L. Grooms

1929-1933            Theodore C. Dorl

1928-1929            Ernest Bruce Haswell

1927-1928            John E. Weis

1924-1927            Ernest Bruce Haswell

1922-1924            Herman H. Wessel

1920-1922            George Debereiner

1918-1920            Martin Rettig

1916-1918            James R. Hopkins

1914-1916            Paul Ashbrook

1912-1914            Theodore C. Dorl

1910-1912            Lewis Henry Meakin

1908-1910            John Rettig

1908       Henry F. Farny

1906-1908            W. F. Behrens

1904-1906            John Dee Wareham

1903-1904            Leon Van Loo

1902-1903            Paul Jones

1899-1902            John Ward Dunsmore

1898-1899            Clement Barnhorn

1896-1898            Frank Duveneck

1894-1896            Leon Van Loo

1892-1894            Henry F. Farny

1890-1892            John Rettig

External links 
 Official site
 Facebook

References

American artist groups and collectives
Arts organizations based in Ohio
Organizations based in Cincinnati
Arts organizations established in 1890
1890 establishments in Ohio